NGC 5023 is an edge-on spiral galaxy located in the constellation Canes Venatici. It is considered a member of the M51 Group although it is actually relatively isolated from other galaxies. It is approximately 15 kiloparsecs (49,000 light-years) across and contains more than 200 stars with an apparent magnitude of greater than 23.5.

References

External links
 

NGC 5023
NGC 5023
M51 Group
5023
45849
8286